Devsar is a census town in Navsari district  in the state of Gujarat, India.

Demographics
At the 2001 India census, Devsar had a population of 8869. Males constituted 51% of the population and females 49%. Devsar had an average literacy rate of 80%, higher than the national average of 59.5%: male literacy was 84% and female literacy was 75%. In Devsar, 11% of the population were under 6 years of age.

References

Cities and towns in Navsari district